"Galveston" is a song written by Jimmy Webb and popularized by American country music singer Glen Campbell who recorded it with the instrumental backing of members of The Wrecking Crew. In 2003, this song ranked number 8 in CMT's 100 Greatest Songs in Country Music. Campbell's version of the song also went to number 1 on the country music charts.  On other charts, "Galveston" went to number 4 on the Billboard Hot 100 and number one on the  "Easy Listening" charts. It was certified gold by the RIAA in October 1969.

Background and writing
The protagonist is a soldier waiting to go into battle who thinks of the woman he loves and his hometown of Galveston, Texas.

The song was first released in 1968 by a mournful-sounding Don Ho, who introduced Glen Campbell to it when Ho appeared as a guest on The Glen Campbell Goodtime Hour. Campbell's recording of the song, released in early 1969, was perceived by many (who listened carefully to the lyrics) as being a Vietnam War protest song, but Campbell performed it up-tempo. In his original promo video, Campbell was dressed as a soldier in a military-style outfit. Webb has challenged the implication of Campbell's version that it was in any way "a patriotic song". According to Webb, the song is "about a guy who's caught up in something he doesn't understand and would rather be somewhere else".

In Ho's recording, the second verse was:
Galveston, oh Galveston
Wonder if she could forget me
I'd go home if they would let me
Put down this gun
And go to Galveston.
However, in both Campbell's version and in Webb’s own 1972 release (and his later performances), this verse was:
Galveston, oh Galveston
I still hear your sea waves crashing
While I watch the cannons flashing
I clean my gun
And dream of Galveston.

Personnel

According to the AFM contract sheet, the following musicians appeared at the recording session.

Al De Lory - session leader
Bob Felts - contractor
Joe Osborn
Harry Hyams
Armand Kaproff
Jesse Ehrlich
Arnold Belnick
Assa Drori
Tibor Zelig
Ronald Folsom
Joseph DiFiore
William Kurasch
Sid Sharp
Ralph Schaeffer
Leonard Malarsky
Jack Redmond
Gene Cipriano
David Roberts
Lew McCreary
Roy Caton
Ollie Mitchell
Gene Estes
Leon Russell

Other Cover Versions
Within a year of Campbell's hit version, Rolling Stone states, "recordings of “Galveston” had sold six million copies, having been cut by 27 different artists, from fellow country star Faron Young to jazz great Dizzy Gillespie."

Chart performance

Weekly charts

Year-end charts

See also
List of anti-war songs

References

External links
 More complete lyrics at lyricsfreak.com
 Don Ho version via YouTube
 Jimmy Webb live version via YouTube
 Glen Campbell - Galveston via YouTube

1969 singles
Glen Campbell songs
Culture of Galveston, Texas
Songs written by Jimmy Webb
Songs about cities in the United States
Songs about Texas
Capitol Records singles
Song recordings produced by Al De Lory
1969 songs
Anti-war songs